Babcock Lake is a lake in Yosemite National Park of California.

Babcock Lake was named for John P. Babcock, a state wildlife official. It is located at one end of a spur trail which connects the lake to the popular trail between Vogelsang and Merced Lake High Sierra Camps.

See also
List of lakes in California

References

Lakes of Mariposa County, California
Lakes of the Sierra Nevada (United States)
Lakes of Yosemite National Park